Temasek Secondary School (TMS) is a co-educational government autonomous secondary school in Bedok South, Singapore. Founded in 1980, it offers secondary education leading to the Singapore-Cambridge GCE Ordinary Level or Singapore-Cambridge GCE Normal Level examination.

History 
TMS was founded in 1980, sharing a campus with Bedok North Secondary School at Upper Changi Road. In 1995, the school attained autonomy, and in March 1999, it moved to its current campus at Upper East Coast Road. It was ranked at all-time high 16th place among all secondary schools in 2000.

Academic information 
Being a government secondary school, TMS offers three academic streams, namely the four-year Express course, as well as the Normal Course, comprising Normal (Academic) and Normal (Technical) academic tracks.

O Level Express Course 
The Express Course is a nationwide four-year programme that leads up to the Singapore-Cambridge GCE Ordinary Level examination.

Academic subjects 
The examinable academic subjects for Singapore-Cambridge GCE Ordinary Level offered by the school for upper secondary level (via. streaming in secondary 2 level), as of 2017, are listed below.

Notes:
 Subjects indicated with ' * ' are mandatory subjects.
 All students in Singapore are required to undertake a Mother Tongue Language as an examinable subject, as indicated by ' ^ '.
 "SPA" in Pure Science subjects refers to the incorporation of School-based Science Practical Assessment, which 20% of the subject result in the national examination are determined by school-based practical examinations, supervised by the Singapore Examinations and Assessment Board. The SPA Assessment has been replaced by one Practical Assessment in the 2018 O Levels.

Normal Course 
The Normal Course is a nationwide 4-year programme leading to the Singapore-Cambridge GCE Normal Level examination, which runs either the Normal (Academic) curriculum or Normal (Technical) curriculum, abbreviated as N(A) and N(T) respectively.

Normal (Academic) Course 
In the Normal (Academic) course, students offer 5-8 subjects in the Singapore-Cambridge GCE Normal Level examination. Compulsory subjects include:
 English Language
 Mother Tongue Language
 Mathematics
 Combined Humanities
A 5th year leading to the Singapore-Cambridge GCE Ordinary Level examination is available to N(A) students who perform well in their Singapore-Cambridge GCE Normal Level examination. Students can move from one course to another based on their performance and the assessment of the school principal and teachers.

Normal (Technical) Course 
The Normal (Technical) course prepares students for a technical-vocational education at the Institute of Technical Education. Students will offer 5-7 subjects in the Singapore-Cambridge GCE Normal Level examination. The curriculum is tailored towards strengthening students’ proficiency in English and Mathematics. Students take English Language, Mathematics, Basic Mother Tongue and Computer Applications as compulsory subjects.

Notable alumni 
 HubbaBubbas, post-acoustic trio
 Ivy Lee, former actress
 Joanne Peh, actress
 Fann Wong, actress
 Wong Li-Lin, former actress and television presenter

References

External links 
 Official website

Autonomous schools in Singapore
Secondary schools in Singapore